Youth of Chopin (Polish: Młodość Chopina) is a  1952 Polish film scripted and directed by Aleksander Ford, and produced by Film Polski at the Lodz Film Studio during 1951.  It was released in the United States with English subtitles as Young Chopin in 1952 by Artkino Pictures

Plot
A story of Chopin's life between 1825 and 1830 (ages 15 to 21).

Main cast
 Czesław Wołłejko as Fryderyk Chopin
 Aleksandra Śląska as Konstancja Gładkowska
 Jan Kurnakowicz as Józef Elsner
 Tadeusz Białoszczyński as Joachim Lelewel
 Gustaw Buszyński as Adam Jerzy Czartoryski
 Igor Śmiałowski as Tytus Woyciechowski
 Jerzy Kaliszewski as Maurycy Mochnacki
 Justyna Kreczmarowa
 Maciej Maciejewski
 Emil Karewicz
 Jerzy Duszyński
 Leon Pietraszkiewicz
 Seweryn Butrym
Leon Pietraszkiewicz as Nikołaj Nowosilcow
Tadeusz Cygler as major Nikołaj Łunin
Stefan Śródka 
Lech Ordon as student
Maksymilian Chmielarczyk as Koźmian

References

External links 
 

1952 films
1950s historical films
1950s Polish-language films
Films directed by Aleksander Ford
Films about classical music and musicians
Films about composers
Cultural depictions of Frédéric Chopin
Polish historical films
Polish black-and-white films
Films set in the 1820s
Films set in the 1830s